The Ancestor Game is a 1992 Miles Franklin literary award-winning novel by the Australian author Alex Miller.  The Ancestor Game was republished by Allen & Unwin in 2003.

Reviews
'Takes the historical novel to new frontiers. It is fabulous in every sense of the word.' - Commonwealth Writers Prize judges

'Extraordinary fictional portraits of China and Australia.' - New York Times Book Review

'A major new novel of grand design and rich texture, a vast canvas of time and space, its gaze outward yet its vision intimate and intellectually abundant.' - The Age

Awards
 1993 Winner Miles Franklin Literary Award 
 1993 Winner Overall Best Book Award Commonwealth Writers Prize
 1993 Shortlisted NBC Banjo Awards, NBC Banjo Award for Fiction 
 1992 Joint Winner FAW Barbara Ramsden Award for the Book of the Year

Novels by Alex Miller
1992 Australian novels
Miles Franklin Award-winning works